The greater round-eared bat (Tonatia bidens) is a bat species found in northeastern and southern Brazil, northern Argentina, Paraguay and  Bolivia. The species feeds on fruit as well as hunting small birds. Once caught, birds are taken to a shelter and consumed.

References

Bats of South America
Bats of Brazil
Phyllostomidae
Mammals described in 1823
Taxa named by Johann Baptist von Spix